"The Felix Klein Protocols" is a collection of handwritten records of the Göttingen seminar lectures of Felix Klein and his school. They span  over 8000 pages in 29 volumes, and are regarded as one of the richest records of mathematical activity in modern times.
The previously unpublished Klein Protocols were made available digitally in 2006.

A searchable index of the protocols can be found at Felix Klein Protokolle.

Years covered
From 1872 to 1896 Klein conducted his seminars alone, mainly in pure mathematics.  The years 1897–1913 show collaborations with mathematicians such as David Hilbert, Karl Schwarzschild, Ludwig Prandtl, Carl Runge and Hermann Minkowski.

References

Mathematics manuscripts